The Sandie River is a tributary of Beigang River in Chiayi County, Taiwan.

See also
List of rivers in Taiwan

References

Rivers of Taiwan
Landforms of Chiayi County